Duckham is a surname. Notable people with the surname include:
Alexander Duckham (1877–1945), English chemist and businessman
Sir Arthur Duckham (1879–1932), English chemical engineer
David Duckham (born 1946), English rugby union player
Thomas Duckham (1816–1902), English farmer, cattle breeder and Liberal politician